Linea 77 is an Italian metal band formed in 1993.

"Inno all'odio," a song from their fifth studio album, Available for Propaganda was featured on the soundtrack of FIFA 06. They were formerly signed to Universal Records. In 2008, Linea 77 released a single entitled "Sogni risplendono" featuring vocals from Italian singer-songwriter Tiziano Ferro.

Band members
Nitto (Nicola Sangermano) - vocals
Chinaski (Paolo Pavanello) - guitar
Dade (Davide Pavanello) - bass (1993–2012), vocals (2012)
Tozzo (Christian Montanarella) - drums, percussion
 Maggio (Fabio Zompa) - bass (2012)
 Paolo (Paolo Paganelli) - guitar (2012)

Former members
 Sibba - vocals (1993–1996)
 Colino - guitar (1993–1996)
 Emi (Emiliano Audisio) - vocals (1993–2012)

Timeline

Discography

Albums
 1998 - Too Much Happiness Makes Kids Paranoid
 2000 - Ket.ch.up Sui.ci.de
 2003 - Numb
 2005 - Available for Propaganda
 2007 - Venareal
 2008 - Horror Vacui
 2010 - 10
 2011 - Live 2010 (Live)
 2013 - La speranza è una trappola (EP)*
 2015 - Oh!

Demo
 1995 - Ogni cosa al suo posto
 1997 - Kung fu
 1998 - The Spaghetti Incident?

Singles and music videos
 1998 - Meat
 2000 - Ket.ch.up Sui.ci.de
 2001 - Potato Music Machine
 2001 - Moka
 2003 - Fantasma
 2003 - Third Moon
 2004 - 66 (diabolus in musica) (feat. Subsonica)
 2005 - Evoluzione
 2006 - Inno All'Odio
 2008 - Il Mostro
 2008 - Sogni Risplendono (feat. Tiziano Ferro)
 2008 - The Sharp Sound of Blades
 2008 - La Nuova Musica Italiana
 2009 - Mi Vida
 2010 - Vertigine
 2010 - Aspettando Meteoriti
 2010 - L'ultima Volta
 2012 - Il Veleno
 2012 - La musica è finita
 2013 - La Caduta (feat. LNRipley)
 2013 - L'involuzione della specie
 2014 - Io sapere poco leggere
 2015 - Absente Reo
 2015 - Divide et Impera (feat. Enigma)

Videography
 Numbed (2004)

Notes and references

External links
Official website

1993 establishments in Italy
Earache Records artists
Italian heavy metal musical groups
Musical groups established in 1993
Musical groups from Piedmont
Nu metal musical groups